The 1937 Cork Intermediate Football Championship was the 28th staging of the Cork Intermediate Football Championship since its establishment by the Cork County Board in 1909. The draw for the opening round fixtures took place on 31 January 1937. The championship ran from 11 April to 31 October 1937.

The final was played on 31 October 1937 at the Dunmanway Gaelic Grounds, between St. Nicholas' and Bantry Blues, in what was their first meeting in the final in three years. St. Nicholas' won the match, a replay, by 3-03 to 0-02 to claim their second championship title overall and a first title in 20 years.

Results

Quarter-finals

 Mallow received a bye in this round.

Semi-final

Final

References

Cork Intermediate Football Championship